Phenampromide is an opioid analgesic from the ampromide family of drugs, related to other drugs such as propiram and diampromide. It was invented in the 1960s by American Cyanamid Co.
Although never given a general release, it was trialled and  50mg codeine ≈ 60mg phenampromide. Tests on the 2 isomers showed that all of the analgesic effects were caused by the (S) isomer. In the book a 4-phenyl group added to the piperidine-ring produces a drug some x60 morphine. The potency derives from the fact that it overlays fentanyl. Like fentanyl, the addition of a 4-hydroxy group to the 4-piperidylphenyl derivative increases potency to x150 morphine for the racemic compound

Phenampromide produces similar effects to other opioids, including analgesia, sedation, dizziness and nausea.

Phenampromide is in Schedule I of the Controlled Substances Act 1970 of the United States as a Narcotic with ACSCN 9638 with a zero aggregate manufacturing quota as of 2014.  The free base conversion ratio for salts includes 0.88 for the hydrochloride.  It is listed under the Single Convention for the Control of Narcotic Substances 1961 and is controlled in most countries in the same fashion as is morphine.

References 

Synthetic opioids
1-Piperidinyl compounds
Propionamides
Anilides
Mu-opioid receptor agonists